Philaccolilus is a genus of beetles in the family Dytiscidae, containing the following species:

 Philaccolilus ameliae Balke, Larson, Hendrich & Konyorah, 2000
 Philaccolilus aterrimus Balke, Larson, Hendrich & Konyorah, 2000
 Philaccolilus bacchusi Balke, Larson, Hendrich & Konyorah, 2000
 Philaccolilus bellissimus Balke, Larson, Hendrich & Konyorah, 2000
 Philaccolilus bicinctus (Régimbart, 1892)
 Philaccolilus incognitus Balke, Larson, Hendrich & Konyorah, 2000
 Philaccolilus irianensis Balke, Larson, Hendrich & Konyorah, 2000
 Philaccolilus kokodanus Balke, Larson, Hendrich & Konyorah, 2000
 Philaccolilus mas Balke, Larson, Hendrich & Konyorah, 2000
 Philaccolilus mekus Balke, Larson, Hendrich & Konyorah, 2000
 Philaccolilus ramuensis Balke, Larson, Hendrich & Konyorah, 2000
 Philaccolilus speciosus (Régimbart, 1892)

References

Dytiscidae